The Polar Bear King is a 1991 Norwegian fantasy adventure film directed by Ola Solum and starring Jack Fjeldstad, Maria Bonnevie, Tobias Hoesl, Monica Nordquist, and Anna-Lotta Larsson. The film is based on the Norwegian fairy tale The White Bear, King Valemon.

Plot 

The land of the far north is ruled by a wise king who has three daughters, one of whom shall one day rule over his kingdom of Winterland. The two older daughters lack depth and understanding, but the youngest is good hearted and kind. She is also uncommonly brave. Unfortunately for the king, she has always desired to live in a land with flowers.

Far to the south young prince Valemon becomes king, however an evil witch has designs on becoming the most powerful person in the world. She believes she can do so by producing a child with the prince. The new king does not wish great power over others, and has no intention of marrying the witch. Angry, the witch curses the young king by turning him into a bear by day, and marks that he has seven years to find someone to fall in love him, and marry him. Further, if anyone should look upon his human face before the seven years are over, he will have lost and will have to marry the witch.

The miserable bear travels north, and enters Winterland. There the growling beast meets the young princess, who has her father's gift of being able to speak with animals. She asks the bear why he is so angry, and learns that he is not a bear, but is really the king of Summerland, cursed to look as he does. When she learns his secret and sees the flowers of Summerland reflected in his eyes, she is filled with compassion for the young king and agrees to go to Summerland with him as his wife.

After their arrival the witch sets about trying to harm the young couple, but is thwarted by the King's mother, who has some mastery of magic as well. With each new child the couple is blessed with the witch arrives to harm them, but the child disappears into safety before the witch can strike. Though their children are safe, the young princess does not know what has become of them. Heartbroken over losing her children, she falls into a deep despair. Hearing of this, her father sends her a special gift, and asks her to visit him. Through the love of her father she is greatly restored, however her older sisters plant the idea in her mind that she should light a candle while her husband sleeps to see what he looks like. As soon as she does the witch appears with a laugh and takes Valemon. Overcome with guilt and grief, she sets out to free him. The effort to rescue Valemon will require all her bravery and guile.

Cast 
 Jack Fjeldstad as the King of the Winterland
 Maria Bonnevie as Princess
 Tobias Hoesl as King Valemon
 Steve Kratz as Valemon's voice (Swedish)
 David Forman as King Valemon's Polar Bear form (puppeteer)
 Monica Nordquist as King Valemon's Mother
 Anna-Lotta Larsson as Witch 
 Helge Jordal as the Devil
 Marika Enstad as the Oldest Princess
 Kristin Mack as the Middle Princess
 Espen Skjønberg as the narrator

Production and release
The story was adapted from the Norwegian folktales East of the Sun and West of the Moon and the fairy tale The White Bear, King Valemon, both from the collection of tales gathered by Peter Christen Asbjørnsen and Jørgen Engebretsen Moe. Erik Borge wrote the screenplay. The musical score for the film was composed by Geir Bøhren and Bent Åserud. Filming was completed in Norway and Sweden. The bear in the movie was created by Jim Henson's Creature Shop. The film was produced in Norway, Sweden and Germany. Originally recorded in Norwegian, the film was dubbed in German and English. It was first released on 28 November 1991 in Germany. It premiered in Oslo two weeks later, on 12 December 1991.

References

External links 

 
 The Polar Bear King (1991), Vimeo
 Der Eisbärkönig (1991) trailer in German
 East of the Sun and West of the Moon (Norwegian folktale version)

1991 films
1990s fantasy adventure films
1990s children's films
Films about shapeshifting
Films about witchcraft
Films about polar bears
Norwegian children's films
Norwegian fantasy adventure films
The Devil in film
Demons in film